NGC 45 is a low surface brightness spiral galaxy in the equatorial constellation of Cetus. It was discovered on 11 November 1835 by the English astronomer John Herschel. It is located in the vicinity of the Sculptor Group, but is most likely a background galaxy.

The morphological class of NGC 45 is SA(s)dm, indicating this is a spiral galaxy with no prominent inner bar (SA) or ring (s) feature. There is no central bulge to speak of. Star formation is proceeding at a modest rate of ·yr−1.

Unlike the Milky Way, NGC 45 has no clearly defined spiral arms, and its center bar nucleus is also very small and distorted. NGC 45 thus does not have a galactic habitable zone. For the Milky Way, the galactic habitable zone is commonly believed to be an annulus with an outer radius of about 10 kiloparsecs and an inner radius close to the Galactic Center, both of which lack hard boundaries.

On May 22, 2018, a luminous red nova was detected within NGC 45 and was subsequently labeled AT 2018bwo. Luminous red novae like this are thought to be the result of stars merging. The progenitor of AT 2018bwo was a yellow supergiant star.

References

External links
 Revised NGC Data for NGC 45
 
 

Unbarred spiral galaxies
NGC 0045
NGC 0045
0045
04-01-21
000004
00930
18351111
Discoveries by John Herschel